One of the first streams of Romanesque architecture in Europe from the 10th century and the beginning of 11th century is called First Romanesque or Lombard Romanesque. It took place in the region of Lombardy (at that time the term encompassing the whole of Northern Italy) and spread into Catalonia and into the south of France. Its principal decoration for the exterior, bands of ornamental blind arches are called Lombard bands. It was characterized by thick walls and lack of sculpture in facades, and with interiors profusely painted with frescoes.

During the first quarter of the 11th century, much architectural activity by groups composed of Lombard teachers and stonemasons (Comacine Guild), who worked throughout much of Europe and Catalan territories and erected fairly uniform temples, some of which still exist today. For a considerable area this process of craft diffusion started in Lombardy and Lombardus became the word for mason at an early period. One might call the First Romanesque style the style of this Italian architectural reconquest. The large promoter and sponsor of this art in Catalonia was Oliva, monk and abbot of the monastery of Ripoll who, in 1032, ordered the extension of the body of this building with a façade with two towers, plus a transept which included seven apses, all decorated on the outside with the Lombardic ornamentation of blind arches and vertical strips.

Catalan architect Josep Puig i Cadafalch suggested that what was formerly considered the late form of pre-Romanesque architecture in Catalonia bore features of Romanesque and thus classified it as First Romanesque (primer romànic). The First Romanesque churches of the Vall de Boí were declared a World Heritage Site by UNESCO in November 2000.

The geographical proximity of this Iberian region to the rest of Europe, resulted in depictions of the emerging Romanesque art being brought to Catalonia. While the art failed to take root in the rest of the Iberian Peninsula until the second third of the 11th century, there are numerous examples of its presence in Catalan counties before this time. Though this style may not be considered fully Romanesque, the area contained many of the defining characteristics of this artistic style.

To avoid the term Pre-Romanesque, which is often used with a much broader meaning than is generally suited to refer to early Medieval and early Christian art, and in Spain may also refer to the Visigothic, Asturias, Mozarabic and Repoblación art forms, Puig i Cadafalch preferred to use the term "First Romanesque" or "first Romanesque art" to designate those Catalan anticipations of the Romanesque itself.

List of First Romanesque buildings

Italy
Lombardy
Basilica dei Santi Pietro e Paolo in Agliate near Monza
Priorato di Sant'Egidio in Sotto il Monte
Basilica di Santa Giulia in Bonate Sotto
Piona Abbey near Lecco
Santa Maria Maggiore, Lomello
Sant'Ambrogio in Milan c. 1048
San Michele Maggiore, Pavia
Rotonda di San Tomè in Almenno San Bartolomeo
Basilica of Sant'Abbondio in Como
Basilica di San Vincenzo in Cantù
Rotonda di San Lorenzo in Mantua
San Vincenzo in Prato in Milan

Emilia-Romagna
Modena Cathedral
Nonantola Abbey
Fidenza Cathedral
Piacenza Cathedral
Parma Cathedral

Spain
Catalonia
Sant Pere de Roda, founded 943, started construction c. 950
Ripoll Monastery. Finished and consecrated in 977
Church of Sant Vicenç in Cardona, started in 1029 and consecrated in 1040
Sant Cristòfol of Beget
Sant Pere of Besalú
Sant Vicenç of Besalú
Monastery of Sant Miquel, Cruïlles
Sant Vicenç of Espinelves
Part of Girona Cathedral
Monastery of Sant Pere de Galligans in Girona
Sant Nicolau in Girona
Saint Cecil of Molló
Church of Sant Joan in Palau-saverdera
Monastery of Sant Quirze de Colera in Rabós d'Empordá
Monastery of Sant Aniol d'Aguja
Monastery of Santa Maria of Vilabertran
Churches of Saint Mary and Saint Clement of Taüll, Sant Feliu, Sant Joan de Boí, Santa Maria de l'Assumpció, Santa Maria de Cardet, la Nativitat de Durro, Ermita de Sant Quiric and Santa Eulàlia, in  Vall de Boí, 
Churches of Santa Maria, Sant Pere and Sant Miquel in Terrassa
Church of Saints Just and Pastor, in Son (Pallars Sobirà)

Huesca
Church of San Caprasio in Santa Cruz de la Serós (Huesca)
Monastery of San Pedro de Siresa (Huesca)
Church of San Adrián de Sasave (Huesca)
Church of Baros (Huesca)
Church of Asieso (Huesca)
Church of Binacua (Huesca)
Churches of the Serrablo (Huesca), it is debatable whether they are First Romanesque or Mozarab: Ordovés, Rasal, Lasieso, Arto, Isún, Satué, Lárrade, San Juan de Busa, Oliván, Orós Bajo, Susín, Basarán (now in Formigal), Otal, S. Juan de Espierre and San Bartolomé de Gavín

Valladolid
Nuestra Señora de la Anunciada Hermitage, in Urueña

France
Church of Saint-Étienne, Vignory 1050–1057
St Philibert at Tournus
Saint-Martin-du-Canigou, begun 1001

See also 
Iberian pre-Romanesque art and architecture
List of architectural styles
Wiligelmo
Benedetto Antelami

References

Sources

 Armi, Edson. Orders and Continuous Orders in Romanesque Architecture., Department of Art, University of Chicago. Oct 1975. pp. 173–188. 
 Kostof, Spiro. A History of Architecture., Oxford: Oxford University Press, 1995.
Chueca Goitia, Fernando Historia de la Arquitectura Española, Edad Antigua y Media Editorial DOSSAT, 1965. Chapter: El primer arte románico. pp. 148–156. 
Chueca Goitia, Fernando Historia de la Arquitectura occidental: Edad Media cristiana en España Ed. DOSSAT, 2000. 
Yarza, Joaquín Arte y arquitectura en España, 500-1250 Manuales arte Cátedra, 1997.

External links
St-Etienne, Vignory (France) – Photo Page from Adrian Fletcher’s Paradoxplace
Círculo Románico - Visigothic, Mozarabic and Romanesque art in Europe

·
Lombard architecture
Medieval architecture
.
.
.
.
Architectural styles